Global Health Promotion is a quarterly peer-reviewed public health journal that covers health promotion and health education. The editor-in-chief is Suzanne Jackson (University of Toronto). It was established in 1994 and is currently published by SAGE Publications on behalf of International Union for Health Promotion and Education.

Abstracting and indexing 
According to the Journal Citation Reports, 2021 impact factor was 2.066, ranking it 128 out of 136 journals in the category "Public, Environmental & Occupational Health (SSCI)"

References

External links 
 

SAGE Publishing academic journals
Multilingual journals
Healthcare journals
Quarterly journals
Publications established in 1994